The 300 West Adams Building (a.k.a. 300 West Adams Street Office Building) exemplifies several themes in the development of Chicago's Central Area. As a 1920s-era office building in the West Loop, the building reflects the outward expansion of Chicago's office business district from its historic core into former warehouse districts along the Chicago River. The twelve-story terra cotta-clad building is an excellent example of the Gothic Revival architectural style and a fine example of the important use in Chicago of architectural terra cotta for large-scale commercial buildings. Through its handsome design and excellent craftsmanship, the 300 West Adams Office Building epitomizes the high-rise office building boom of the 1920s and stands today as a significant example of this historic building type.

Early history
Before the Chicago Fire, the area directly along the river was predominantly commercial warehouses. In April 1879, one such warehouse was constructed at the northwest corner of Adams Street and Franklin Street on the site of today's 300 West Adams. Originally it was built for the Armour-Dole Grain Company. Later the building was converted into a wholesale store for Carson Pirie Scott and Company. By 1905, the warehouse was surrounded by similar structures.

As commercial real estate pressure increased, the area saw a trend of redevelopment. With the completion of Union Station in 1925, Carson Pirie Scott began plans to create office space in place of their warehouse. In January 1926, Carson Piri Scott announced that their wholesale building at Adams and Franklin would be remodeled into a "High class office building," while retaining its six-story height. Only a few months later, the plan was revised to include the demolition of the existing structure and its replacement with an entirely new twelve-story office building.

Before ground had broken on the site, substantial space had already been leased to the U.S. Gypsum Co.; the R.G. Dun & Co.; the Transportation Freight Bureau, and the General Chemical Co.

The McLennan Construction company was the general contractor, and the building was completed by April 1, 1927.

References

Buildings and structures in Chicago
Gothic Revival architecture in Illinois